Veneux-les-Sablons is a former commune in the Seine-et-Marne department in the Ile-de-France region in north-central France. On 1 January 2017, it was merged into the commune Moret-Loing-et-Orvanne.

It is located near Moret-sur-Loing. Moret–Veneux-les-Sablons station has rail connections to Montargis, Melun, Montereau-Fault-Yonne, Laroche-Migennes and Paris.

Demographics
Inhabitants of Veneux-les-Sablons are known as Veneusiens.

Twin towns and sister cities

Veneux-les-Sablons is twinned with:
 Louny, Czech Republic, since 2004.
 Zschopau, Germany, since 2010.

See also
Communes of the Seine-et-Marne department

References

External links

 Office de tourisme de Moret Seine et Loing

Former communes of Seine-et-Marne